Hilland is an extinct town in Haakon County, in the U.S. state of South Dakota. The GNIS classifies it as a populated place.

History
Hilland was laid out in 1908, and named for Hilland Campbell, the son of a first settler. A post office called Hilland was established in 1908, and remained in operation until 1958.

References

Ghost towns in South Dakota
Geography of Haakon County, South Dakota